John T. Hughes (July 25, 1817 – August 11, 1862) was a colonel in the Missouri State Guard and Confederate Army during the American Civil War.  He might also have been a brigadier general at the time of his death but documentation of the appointment is lacking.

Early life career, and Mexican War

John Taylor Hughes was born July 25, 1817 near Versailles, Kentucky to Samuel and Nancy (Price) Hughes.  His family moved to Fayette, Missouri when he was very young.  He was an 1844 graduate of Bonne Femme College and taught school until the outbreak of the Mexican War in 1846. He enlisted as a private in the 1st Regiment Missouri Mounted Volunteers of Doniphan's expedition  and penned his personal account of the trek upon his discharge in 1847.

Hughes' book provided national fame and following his move to Plattsburg, Missouri in 1848, he became editor of a Clinton County, Missouri newspaper, the school superintendent, militia colonel, and state representative in 1854.  He was also a planter and slaveowner.

Civil War and death
Hughes was a cousin to Sterling Price and like Price professed Conditional Unionism until the Camp Jackson Affair, after which he joined the Missouri State Guard and was elected colonel of the 1st Regiment, 4th Division.  He participated in the Battle of Carthage and the Battle of Wilson's Creek.  He was slightly wounded in the Siege of Lexington.

At the Battle of Pea Ridge in March 1862, Hughes took over command of a brigade from the wounded Brigadier general William Yarnell Slack.  Hughes returned to Missouri in the summer of 1862 to recruit for the Confederacy.  At this time he may have been appointed as either an acting Confederate or Missouri State Guard brigadier general.  No record of the appointment has been found but he was known as "general." 

He, his recruits, and several other recruiting or partisan bands united to attack the garrison of Independence, Missouri on August 11, 1862 with Hughes in overall command.  During this battle (the First Battle of Independence), he was killed instantly by a shot to the head while leading a charge, but the city was captured. He is interred at Woodlawn Cemetery in Independence.  He left behind a wife, Mary, and five young sons.

See also
List of American Civil War generals (Acting Confederate)

References

1817 births
1862 deaths
People from Versailles, Kentucky
American people of Welsh descent
American military personnel of the Mexican–American War
People of Missouri in the American Civil War
Confederate States Army generals
Confederate States of America military personnel killed in the American Civil War
Missouri State Guard
People from Fayette, Missouri
American slave owners